Basketball at the 2021 Summer Deaflympics  was held in Caxias Do Sul, Brazil from 30 April to 13 May 2022.

Men's tournament

Group stage

Group A

Group B

Knockout stage

Elimination 
<onlyinclude>

Classification

Women's tournament

Group stage

Group A

Group B

Knockout stage

Elimination

Classification

References

External links
 Deaflympics 2021

2022 in basketball
International basketball competitions hosted by Brazil
2021 Summer Deaflympics